Mohamed Al-Jalai (born October 21, 1972) is a Yemeni judoka, he competed internationally for Yemen at the 1992 Summer Olympics.

Career
Al-Jalai was just 19 years old when he competed in the lightweight class at the 1992 Summer Olympics in Barcelona, Spain, in the first round he was drawn against Juan Vargas from El Salvador, he lost the bout so didn't advance to the next round.

References

External links
 

1972 births
Living people
Yemeni male judoka
Olympic judoka of Yemen
Judoka at the 1992 Summer Olympics